The 2010–11 CEV Cup was the 39th edition of the European CEV Cup volleyball club tournament.

Participating teams

Main phase

16th Finals
The 16 winning teams from the 1/16 Finals will compete in the 1/8 Finals playing Home & Away matches. The losers of the 1/16 Final matches will qualify for the 3rd round in Challenge Cup.

|}

First leg

|}

Second leg

|}

8th Finals

|}

First leg

|}

Second leg

|}

4th Finals

|}

First leg

|}

Second leg

|}

Challenge phase

|}

First leg 

|}

Second leg 

|}

Final phase

Semi finals

|}

First leg

|}

Second leg

|}

Final

First leg

|}

Second leg

|}

Final standing

References

External links
 Official site

2010-11
2010 in volleyball
2011 in volleyball